List of presidents of the First Chamber of the Estates of Württemberg

Sources
Raberg, Frank (editor): Biographisches Handbuch der württemberbergische Lantagsabgeordneten 1815-1933, Kohlhammer Verlag, Stuttgart 2001 

Political history of Germany
Württemberg